Djilly Arsène Dit Patrick Vouho (born 25 June 1987) is an Ivorian professional footballer who plays as a striker for Greek Super League 2 club Ierapetra.

Club career
Born in Seguela, Worodougou, Vouho moved to Portugal at the age of 20, signing with Académica de Coimbra from Sabé Sports de Bouna. He made his Primeira Liga debut on 2 September 2007, starting and playing 57 minutes in a 0–2 away loss against C.S. Marítimo. In January of the following year, he was loaned to Portimonense S.C. until June.

Vouho's only season in the Portuguese top flight was 2009–10, when he scored once in 15 games for Académica. On either side of that spell, he competed in the country's Segunda Liga with C.D. Santa Clara and S.C. Covilhã, also on loan.

In 2011–12, Vouho netted nine goals to help AEL Limassol conquer its first Cypriot First Division title in 44 years. He bettered those totals in the following campaign, but his team could only rank fifth.

In January 2015, following a spell in Georgia with FC Dinamo Tbilisi, where he won a Georgian Cup, Vouho returned to Portugal and Santa Clara. In the summer, he joined another club in the second tier, Atlético Clube de Portugal.

Afterwards, Vouho played in Greece, starting out at OFI Crete F.C. in the Football League. He scored a career-best 15 goals in his only season, helping to a fourth-place finish.
 
Vouho remained in the country in the following off-season, signing with Super League team PAS Lamia 1964. He scored his first goal for them on 3 December 2017, in the last minute of the 2–2 home draw against Panetolikos FC.

Vouho returned to OFI on 30 January 2018, as a free agent.

Honours

Club

AEL Limassol
 Cypriot First Division: 2011–12

Dinamo Tbilisi
 Georgian Cup: 2013–14

References

External links

1987 births
Living people
People from Woroba District
Ivorian footballers
Association football forwards
Primeira Liga players
Liga Portugal 2 players
Associação Académica de Coimbra – O.A.F. players
Portimonense S.C. players
C.D. Santa Clara players
S.C. Covilhã players
Atlético Clube de Portugal players
Cypriot First Division players
AEL Limassol players
Erovnuli Liga players
FC Dinamo Tbilisi players
Super League Greece players
Football League (Greece) players
OFI Crete F.C. players
PAS Lamia 1964 players
Apollon Smyrnis F.C. players
Ivorian expatriate footballers
Expatriate footballers in Portugal
Expatriate footballers in Cyprus
Expatriate footballers in Georgia (country)
Expatriate footballers in Greece
Ivorian expatriate sportspeople in Portugal
Ivorian expatriate sportspeople in Cyprus
Ivorian expatriate sportspeople in Greece